Éric Biau (born 4 February 1964 in Paris) is a French slalom canoeist who competed from the late 1980s to the late 1990s. He won seven medals at the ICF Canoe Slalom World Championships with a gold (C2 team: 1997), three silvers (C2: 1993; C2 team: 1993, 1995) and three bronzes (C2: 1995, 1999; C2 team: 1999).

He also won a bronze medal in the C2 team event at the 1998 European Championships in Roudnice nad Labem.

Biau also finished 11th in the C2 event at the 1992 Summer Olympics in Barcelona.

His partner in the boat for most of his active career was Bertrand Daille.

World Cup individual podiums

References

External links 
 
 

1964 births
Canoeists at the 1992 Summer Olympics
French male canoeists
Living people
Olympic canoeists of France
Medalists at the ICF Canoe Slalom World Championships
Sportspeople from Paris